The Tel Aviv–Jerusalem bus 405 attack was a suicide attack on 6 July 1989 carried out by Abd al-Hadi Ghanim of the Palestinian Islamic Jihad. On a crowded Egged commuter bus line No. 405 en route from Tel-Aviv to Jerusalem, Ghanim seized the steering wheel of the bus, running it off a steep cliff into a ravine in the area of Qiryat Ye'arim. 16 civilians—including two Canadians and one American—died in the attack, and 27 were wounded.

The incident is described as the first Palestinian suicide attack despite the fact that the attacker survived.

Attack
On 6 July 1989, Egged commuter bus line No. 405 began its regular route from Tel Aviv to Jerusalem. When the bus passed Neve Ilan, Ghanim attacked the driver, seized the steering wheel of the bus and pulled the bus over a steep precipice into a ravine in the area of Qiryat Ye'arim. The driver was unable to stabilize the bus; as a result the vehicle rolled down the depth of the ravine and caught fire. Some of the passengers were burned alive.

Sixteen civilians were killed in the attack, including two Canadians and one American, and 27 were wounded. Students from the Telz-Stone yeshiva who heard the screaming rushed to the scene to administer first aid. One of them, Yehuda Meshi Zahav, went on to found ZAKA, a volunteer rescue service organization.

Perpetrator
The perpetrator, who survived the crash, received medical treatment for his injuries in an Israeli hospital. After the attack, it was revealed that the perpetrator was a 25-year-old Palestinian Islamic Jihad militant named Abd al-Hadi Rafa Ghanim who originated from the Nusseirat refugee camp in the Gaza Strip. Ghanim was convicted and given 16 life sentences for murder, hijacking and terrorism. On 18 October 2011, Ghanim was released to Gaza as part of the Gilad Shalit prisoner exchange between Israel and Hamas.

In popular culture
In the NBC drama Heroes, the character Hana Gitelman, along with her grandmother and mother, were on board when the attack happened. Of the three, Hana was the sole survivor and in the series, she is turned into a superhero.
Israeli singer Ruhama Raz recorded the song "As Rachel Waited" (כחכות רחל), which she wrote in memory of her sister, Miriam Tzerafi, who was killed in the attack.
Author Paul Rabinowitz uses the incident as the arc of his novella, "The Clay Urn" (Main St. Rag Publishers, 2020). The author was guiding a group of tourists when the oncoming bus (405) went off the cliff. He was the first one into the ravine and comforted one of the female passengers who will become the inspiration for the main character, Ilana. "The Clay Urn" was originally published as a short story in Linden Avenue Literary Journal, 2016.

See also
Coastal Road massacre
List of Palestinian Islamic Jihad suicide attacks

References

External links
An eyewitness account of the driver who survived the attack 
MEMRI account of Palestinian media glorifying the terrorist
Newspaper article reporting the attack
Jay Levinson and Elie Shmeltzer, "Disaster Victim Identification: Bus 405," Journal of Disaster Management, Volume 2/4 (April 1990).
Jay Levinson, "The Crash of Bus 405: Victim Identification," International Criminal Police Review (INTER-POL, France), (May–June 1992).

Islamic Jihad Movement in Palestine
Terrorist incidents in Asia in 1989
Terrorist incidents on buses in Asia
Attacks on buses by Palestinian militant groups
Terrorist attacks attributed to Palestinian militant groups
Mass murder in 1989
Islamic terrorist incidents in the 1980s
Islamic terrorism in Israel
Terrorist incidents in Israel
1989 murders in Israel
Terrorist incidents in Israel in the 1980s
Terrorist incidents in Jerusalem in the 1980s
1980s in Jerusalem
1980s in Tel Aviv